Ornativalva plicella is a moth of the family Gelechiidae. It was described by Sattler in 1976. It is found in southern Iran.

Adults have been recorded on wing in April.

References

Moths described in 1976
Ornativalva